Niger is a state in the North Central region of Nigeria and the largest state in the country. Niger state has three political zones, zone A,B and C. The state's capital is at Minna. Other major cities are Bida, Kontagora and Suleja. It was formed in 1976 when the then North-Western State was divided into Niger State and Sokoto State. It is home to Ibrahim Babangida and Abdulsalami Abubakar, two of Nigeria's former military rulers. The Nupe, Gbagyi, Kamuku, Kambari, Gungawa, Hun-Saare, Hausa and Koro form the majority of numerous indigenous tribes of Niger State.

The state is named after the River Niger. Two of Nigeria's major hydroelectric power stations, the Kainji Dam and Shiroro Dam, are located in Niger State, along with the new Zungeru Dam. The Jebba Dam straddles the border of Niger state and Kwara state. The famous Gurara Falls is in Niger State, and Gurara Local Government Area is named after the Gurara River, on whose course the fall is situated. Also situated there is Kainji National Park, the largest National Park of Nigeria, which contains Kainji Lake, the Borgu Game Reserve and the Zugurma Game Reserve. More so, it blessed with a large natural l monolith, or inselberg, an igneous intrusion composed of gabbro and granodiorite. Zuma Rock rises approx. 300 metres (980 ft) above its surroundings

Government
Like the majority of Nigerian states, it is governed by a Governor and a state House of Assembly. Under the current administration of Abubakar Sani Bello. The state has 25 local government each headed by local government chairman which are also divided into districts, each again with its district head while Villages are headed by village head throughout the state.

Local Government Areas
The state's capital is at Minna city. Niger State has three (3) Senatorial Zones/Districts namely Niger East, Niger North, Niger South. Niger state has 25 local government areas which are:

Bosso Local Government Area
Chanchaga Local Government Area
Gurara Government Area
Munya Local Government Area
Paiko Local Government Area
Rafi Local Government Area
Shiroro Local Government Area
Suleja Local Government Area
Tafa Local Government Area
Agaie Local Government Area
Bida Local Government Area
Edatti Local Government Area
Gbako Local Government Area
Katcha Local Government Area
Lapai Local Government Area
Lavun Local Government Area
Mokwa Local Government Area
Agwara Local Government Area
Borgu Local Government Area
Kontagora Local Government Area
Magama Local Government Area
Mariga Local Government Area
Mashegu Local Government Area
Rijau Local Government Area
Wushishi Local Government Area

Education 
Tertiary educational institutions in Niger state include:

 Federal Polytechnic, Bida
 Federal University of Technology Minna
 Ibrahim Badamasi Babangida University, Lapai
 Niger State Polytechnic, Zungeru
 Federal College of Education Kontagora
 Edusoko University Bida
 New Gate University Minna
 Niger State College of Education Minna
 Government Technical College Minna
 Government Technical College Kontagora
 Niger State College of Nursing Bida
 Government Technical College Bussa
 Government Technical College Eyagi, Bida
 New Gate College of Health Science and Technology Minna
 School of Basic Midwifery Minna
 Federal Government Girls, Bida

Natural Resources 
Niger State has abundant natural resources that occures naturally, these include:

 Uranium
 Coal
 Gold
 Iron ore
 Tin
 Phosphate
 Crude oil
 Molybdenum
 Salt
 Gypsum

Languages
Languages of Niger State listed by LGA:

Climate
There  is very warm climate with a yearly average of 34 degrees, but has few truly tropical and sultry months. It is yearlong warm or hot. Dued to the lesser rain the best time for traveling is from November to April. Sometimes humidity is unfriendlyly high from June to September. The most rainy days occur from the month of May to October.
January is the sunniest month in the state of Niger. In August the sun shines the shortest.
September offers the most number of rainy days, and in December the least.

Gallery

politics
The State government is led by democratically elected governor who works closely with the members of the state's house of assembly. The capital city of the state is Minna.

Electoral System 
Each of the state is selected using a modified two-round system. To be elected in the first round, a candidate must receive the plurality of the vote and over 25% of the vote in at least two -third of the State local government Areas. If no candidate passes threshold, a second round will be held between the top candidate and the next candidate to have received a plurality of votes in the highest number of local government Areas.

See also 
List of governors of Niger State
Niger State Local Government Areas

Local Government Areas

Niger State consists of 25 local government areas. They are:

Agaie
Agwara
Bida
Borgu
Bosso
Chanchaga
Edati
Gbako
Gurara
Katcha
Kontagora
Lapai
Lavun
Magama
Mariga
Mashegu
Mokwa
Munya
Paikoro
Rafi
Rijau
Shiroro
Suleja
Tafa
Wushishi

References

External links 

 Official portal
 News on Niger State

 
States of Nigeria
States and territories established in 1976